Ethirastis is a genus of moths of the  family Heliodinidae. It contains only one species, Ethirastis sideraula, which is found in Australia.

References

Heliodinidae